The Apple A16 Bionic is a 64-bit ARM-based system on a chip (SoC) designed by Apple Inc. and manufactured by TSMC. It is used in the iPhone 14 Pro and 14 Pro Max models only.

Design 
Apple claims the A16 is about 40% faster than the competition, and it also has new efficiency cores, with their big advantage being they use a third of the power of the best efficiency cores of other phones on the market.

The A16 contains 16 billion transistors, a 6.7% increase from the A15's transistor count of 15 billion. It includes an improved neural processing unit (NPU) with 16 cores known as the "Apple Neural Engine", a new image signal processor (ISP) with improved computational photography capabilities, and a new module for handling screen-related features that Apple calls a "Display Engine".

The A16 has hardware video codec encoding and decoding support for HEVC, H.264, and ProRes.

During the iPhone 14 launch event Apple touted the A16 chip as the first 4 nm processor in a smartphone. However, a TechInsights analysis found that the A16 was manufactured by TSMC on their N4P process. "N4P", as it is called, is a de facto 5 nm fabrication process that offers enhancements in performance, power and density when compared to previous products in the same 5 nm family: N5, N5P and N4.

GPU and memory 
The A16 integrates an Apple-designed five-core GPU, which is reportedly coupled with 50% more memory bandwidth when compared to the A15's GPU.

The A16's memory has been upgraded to LPDDR5 for 50% higher bandwidth and a 7% faster 16-core neural engine, capable of 17 trillion operations per second (TOPS). In comparison, the neural engine on the A15 was capable of 15.8 TOPS. All variants of the SoC come with 6 GB of memory. Unlike previous generations of Apple's A-Series chips, the A16 utilises a vertical version of the A12X/M1 packaging instead of traditional PoP DRAM. This system is based on an epoxy glass substrate with DRAM mounted on one side, A16 SoC on the other side, and presumably via's going through the epoxy glass that connect the two. Due to the removal of PoP wires, the A16's energy consumption per DRAM read/write transaction has been slightly reduced.

ISP and Display Engine 
The new image processor (ISP) found on the A16 chip improved its computational photography capabilities. It was designed to handle the higher resolution image sensor found in the iPhone 14 Pro, being capable of performing up to 4 trillion operations per photo.

The Display Engine is a first on Apple A-series. It enables a better functioning "always on display" feature, and handles other tasks such as the 1 Hz refresh rate, the higher peak brightness of the display and improved anti-aliasing techniques that help smooth out rough edges in the rendering of graphics and images on device displays.

Firmware
A new boot chime and shutdown chime was added, only being available in accessibility.

Products that include the Apple A16 Bionic 
 iPhone 14 Pro & 14 Pro Max

See also 
 Apple silicon, range of ARM-based processors designed by Apple for their products
 Comparison of Armv8-A processors

References 

Computer-related introductions in 2022
Apple silicon